Dallarnil is a rural town and locality in the North Burnett Region, Queensland, Australia.

The neighbourhood of Stanton is within the locality.

History 
The town takes its name from the railway station name on the Isis railway line, assigned by the Queensland Railways Department on 2 September 1911. The railway station name was derived from the name of a pastoral run name, and is a corruption of an Aboriginal word, "conalaman" meaning big hill.

Stanton takes its name from the railway station name on the Isis railway line assigned by the Queensland Railways Department on 16 July 1914, which in turn takes its name from the pastoral run Stanton Harcourt named in 1854.

In 1887,  of land were resumed from the Stanton Harcourt pastoral run. The land was offered for selection for the establishment of small farms on 17 April 1887.

In October 1912, 20 allotments of the Dallarnil Township were advertised to be auctioned by Charles White of Biggenden. A map advertising the auction states the allotments were immediately opposite the railway station with the railway line to terminus nearing completion.

Education 
Dallarnil State School is a government primary (Prep-6) school for boys and girls at 3 Main Street. In 2017, the school had an enrolment of 25 students with 5 teachers (2 full-time equivalent) and 4 non-teaching staff (2 full-time equivalent).

There is no secondary school in Dallarnil. The nearest secondary schools are in Biggenden (to Year 10) and Childers (to Year 12).

Heritage listings 
Dallarnil has a number of heritage-listed sites, including:

 Isis Highway: Dallarnil Cemetery
 Isis Highway: Dallarnil Hall and Sports Grounds

References

External links 
 Town map of Dallarnil, 1981

Towns in Queensland
North Burnett Region
Localities in Queensland